The Tonghae Satellite Launching Ground(동해위성발사장), also known as Musudan-ri, is a rocket launching site in North Korea.

Location
It lies in southern Hwadae County, North Hamgyong Province, near Musu Dan, the cape marking the northern end of the East Korea Bay. The area was formerly known as Taep'o-dong (대포동) during the period when Korea was occupied by Japan, and the Taepodong rockets take their name from this. This single loose-surface road is susceptible to seasonal flooding. The site is 45 km northeast of port city of Kimchaek and 45 kilometers (28 miles) from the town of Kilju (길주읍). There is a small wharf located at the fishing village of Tongha-dong but can only accommodate vessels smaller than 40 meters in length.

History
By the early 80s, North Korea needed a flight-test facility for its program to reverse-engineer and produce copies of the Scud-B which it acquired from the Soviet Union in the late 60s. Previously, North Korea used a facility at Hwajin-ri (華進里), Pyongwon-kun, South Pyongan Province to test for anti-ship missiles and probably FROGs, surface-to-air missiles (SAMs) and other rockets. However, Hawjin-ri had insufficient range for the Hwasong-5, which would enter Chinese territorial waters during a test. The construction of the facility continued off and on throughout the 1980s and 1990s. Construction was made by the 117th Regiment under the Air Force Construction Bureau (空軍建設部) of the Ministry of People's Armed Forces. Construction of the launch pad was completed in 1985. During the early stage of construction, the site had an extremely rudimentary infrastructure, such as a few roads, a command bunker, a radar facility, and modest storage and support facilities.

However, by the early 1990s the Tonghae site was reportedly expanded from 2 km to 9 km and the following infrastructure was added: a missile assembly facility, a fuel storage facility, a guidance and range control center, and tracking facilities. Since 1984 military rockets of the types Hwasong, Rodong and Taepodong-1 were launched from Musudan-ri. In 1998, North Korean media reported the successful launch of the Kwangmyŏngsŏng-1 satellite by a Baekdusan-1 SLV from Musudan-ri. North Korea claimed their first satellite was successfully placed into orbit, but no independent sources have confirmed this. A review of the rocket engine test stand on DigitalGlobe imagery coverage from February 15, 2002 to February 26, 2009 revealed a variety of activity, including drying grain on the concrete, the presence of cylindrical storage tanks and the arrival/departure of multiple support vehicles and personnel. A second failed satellite launch attempt apparently occurred in 2006.

The facility is in caretaker status as of 2020 and has been since 2014.

Facilities

The launch pad consists of a 30-meter umbilical tower with a top-mounted gantry crane, a flame blast bucket, a launch blockhouse with a connecting access tunnel, two semi-buried liquid fuel storage buildings, a concrete apron/pad and multiple small support buildings.

See also

Sohae Satellite Launching Station
Punggye-ri Nuclear Test Site
Korean People's Army
Geography of North Korea

References

External links
Musudan on Encyclopedia Astronautica
GlobalSecurity.org Background on Musudan-ri
The Meaning of the North Korean Missile Launch. (2009 launch) Posted by GlobalSecurity.org on 2009-04-05

Rocket launch sites
North Hamgyong
Military of North Korea
Nuclear program of North Korea
Space program of North Korea